Tripura Public Service Commission, publicly known as TPSC is a state government agency of Tripura state, constituted under the Article 315 for conducting civil services examinations and competitive examination purposes. The commission is responsible for recruitment to various civil services and departmental posts at state level.

History 
TPSC came into existence after eight months when Tripura state was formed on 21 January 1972. After being served without its constitutional body for eight months, the commission came into existence on 30 October, 1972 under the Article 315, a provision of Constitution of India.

Functions
State public service commission including TPSC are outlined by the Article 315. They perform several functions related to recruitment process to various civil service in its jurisdiction. It was mainly established to conduct competitive examinations.
To conduct civil and departmental examinations for appointment to various services at the State level.
To recruit the eligible candidates to the Ministerial Services.
To advice state government for making appointments and promotions.
To advice government on transfers of the in-service candidates from one service to another service.

Commission profile
TPSC members are appointed or removed by the state governor. Their terms of services such as promoting or transferring from one service to another is governed by the state governor, if available.

See also

 List of Public service commissions in India

References

External links
Official website 1
Official website 2
Official website 3

Government of Tripura
State agencies of Tripura
State public service commissions of India
Government agencies established in 1972
1972 establishments in Tripura